Elk County Courthouse may refer to:

Elk County Courthouse (Kansas), Howard, Kansas
Elk County Courthouse (Pennsylvania), part of the Ridgway Historic District, Ridgway, Pennsylvania